Margaux Paolino (born July 1, 1997) is an American women's field hockey player. Paolino was added to the United States national team in 2018, following success in the national junior team.

Paolino first represented the United States junior national team in 2014 at a qualifying even for the 2014 Youth Olympic Games in Montevideo, Uruguay. In 2016, Paolino once again represented the junior national team at the 2016 Junior Pan American Cup and 2016 Junior World Cup.

Paolino made her debut for the United States senior team in 2018 in a test series against Canada in San Diego, California. Paolino was selected to compete in the 2018 Vitality Women's Hockey World Cup, The 2019 Pan-American Games and 2019 FIH Olympic Games Qualifier.

References

1997 births
Living people
American female field hockey players
Female field hockey forwards
Duke Blue Devils field hockey players
Pan American Games bronze medalists for the United States
Pan American Games medalists in field hockey
Field hockey players at the 2019 Pan American Games
Medalists at the 2019 Pan American Games